Love Recipe is a 2011 Taiwanese romance drama written by Lu Huixin, Yang Huiwen and directed by Huang Keyi (黄克义). It stars Kenji Wu, Li Jiaying, Emma Wu(Gui Gui) and Rhydian Vaughan as the main characters in the drama.

Synopsis
Fu Yongle (Kenji Wu) is a handsome and easygoing young man. He has a great talent for cooking food and he had a happy childhood. However, unfortunately his parents died and he was adopted by his father's best friend. Fu Yongle doesn't give up his cheerful character because of the misfortune. He tries to restore his father's canteen, and along the way he encounters a lot of surprises, including his true love.

Cast

Music

Theme Song
 愛的秘方 – Kenji Wu (Opening)
 一半一半 – Kenji Wu (Ending)

Reception

References

External links
 

China Television original programming
2011 Taiwanese television series debuts
2011 Taiwanese television series endings